The 1995 Invercargill mayoral election was held on 14 October 1995 as part of the 1995 New Zealand local elections, and was conducted under the First Past the Post system.

Background
Incumbent mayor Tim Shadbolt had been elected in a 1993 by-election as a result of the death of Eve Poole in 1992. His re-election bid was unsuccessful, with ILT chairman David Harrington getting more than double his number of votes. This was seen as part of a wave of conservatism in the south. With 50% of the vote counted, Shadbolt conceded at 7 pm that night. After his loss Shadbolt promised to run again in the next election.

Polling

Results
The following table gives the election results:

References

1995 elections in New Zealand
Mayoral elections in Invercargill
October 1995 events in Oceania